Serhiy Dmytrovych Lavrynenko (born 17 February 1975) is a Ukrainian professional football coach and former player.

Career
Since 2015 till August 2016 he worked a head coach of FC Zirka Kirovohrad, while in late 2014 Lavrynenko performed functions of an acting head coach.

References

External links
 
 Profile on ukr-football.org.ua
 Profile on footballfacts.ru

1975 births
Living people
People from Pokrov, Ukraine
Ukrainian footballers
Association football defenders
FC Zirka Kropyvnytskyi players
FC Zirka-2 Kirovohrad players
FC Sirius Kryvyi Rih players
FC Metalurh Zaporizhzhia players
FC Metalurh-2 Zaporizhzhia players
SSSOR Metalurh Zaporizhzhia players
MFC Mykolaiv players
FC Enerhiya Yuzhnoukrainsk players
Ukrainian Premier League players
Ukrainian First League players
Ukrainian Second League players
Ukrainian football managers
FC Zirka Kropyvnytskyi managers
FC Inhulets Petrove managers
Ukrainian Premier League managers
Ukrainian First League managers
Sportspeople from Dnipropetrovsk Oblast